Lewis Miller Flick (February 18, 1915 – December 7, 1990) was a Major League Baseball outfielder and pinch hitter. He debuted late in the  season, playing right field for the Philadelphia Athletics on September 28. His game was quite impressive, as he got three hits in five at bats (a .600 batting average) while scoring two runs. The following season, he played in 19 games, but the results were not quite so positive, as he managed just 4 hits in 35 at bats for an abysmal .114 average. He also had one stolen base, but did not have any extra base hits.

Both before and after his major league career, Flick put up big numbers in the minor leagues. He also led his league in hits six different times. On July 21, he set a record for most consecutive hits in a single game, hitting safely nine straight times for the Little Rock Travelers of the Southern Association in a 19-inning contest. He grounded out in his final at bat, finishing the game 9-for-10.

References

Sources

Major League Baseball outfielders
Philadelphia Athletics players
New Iberia Cardinals players
Abbeville A's players
Elizabethton Betsy Red Sox players
Knoxville Smokies players
Lancaster Red Roses players
Newark Bears (IL) players
Toledo Mud Hens players
Milwaukee Brewers (minor league) players
Little Rock Travelers players
Jackson Senators players
Pennington Gap Miners players
Big Stone Gap Rebels players
Baseball players from Tennessee
People from Bristol, Tennessee
1915 births
1990 deaths